Tushahr (also Romanized as Tūshahr; also known as Tūshahr-e Aḩmadī) is a village in Ahmadi Rural District, Ahmadi District, Hajjiabad County, Hormozgan Province, Iran. As of the 2006 census, its population was 345, in 85 families.

References 

Populated places in Hajjiabad County